This is a list of people from Adana.

Musine Kokalari Albanian writer and activist.
Theophilus of Adana, Christian saint
Ayşe Arman, columnist
Aytaç Arman, actor
İsmet Atlı, wrestler and Olympic gold medallist
Kirkor Bezdikyan, mayor and deputy of Adana
Hampartsoum Boyadjian, deputy of Adana
Çağla Büyükakçay, Professional tennis player
Selahattin Çolak, politician and mayor of Adana
Demir Demirkan, musician and guitarist
Aytaç Durak, politician and mayor of Adana
Feridun Düzağaç, musician
Haluk Levent, musician
Ali Erdemir, scientist
Timuçin Esen, actor
Kasım Gülek, politician
Tayyibe Gülek, economist and politician
Salih Güney, actor
Yılmaz Güney, film director, actor, scenarist, political activist
Ayşe Hatun Önal, model and singer
Şaziye İvegin-Karslı, basketball player
Muzaffer İzgü, writer and educator
Orhan Kemal, writer
Yaşar Kemal, writer
Eda Özerkan, actress
Ali Özgentürk, film director
Ali Sabancı, businessman (Sabancı Holding)
Güler Sabancı, businesswoman (Sabancı Holding)
Ömer Sabancı, businessman (Sabancı Holding)
Özdemir Sabancı, businessman (Sabancı Holding)
Ali Şen, actor 
Şener Şen, actor
Hasan Şaş, footballer
Jülide Sarıeroğlu, labour economist, trade unionist, politician and government minister
Dolunay Soysert, actress
Kıvanç Tatlıtuğ, actor and model
Ferdi Tayfur, musician
Fatih Terim, former footballer and now a football coach
Hagop Terzian, writer and pharmacist.

See also

List of mayors of Adana

 
Adana